Lenartowice may refer to the following places in Poland:
Lenartowice, Lower Silesian Voivodeship (south-west Poland)
Lenartowice, Opole Voivodeship (south-west Poland)
Lenartowice, Greater Poland Voivodeship (west-central Poland)
Lenartowice, Świętokrzyskie Voivodeship (south-central Poland)